Pavel Aleksandrovich Kanunnikov (June 2, 1898 in village Zolotovo, Bronnitsy Uyezd, Moscow Governorate – April 17, 1974 in Moscow) was a Soviet football player.

Honours
 RSFSR champion: 1922, 1928.

International career
Kanunnikov played his only game for USSR on May 15, 1925 in a friendly against Turkey.

External links
  Profile

1898 births
1974 deaths
Russian footballers
Soviet footballers
Soviet Union international footballers
FC Spartak Moscow players

Association football forwards